Melbourne Punch (from 1900, simply titled Punch) was an Australian illustrated magazine founded by Edgar Ray and Frederick Sinnett, and published from August 1855 to December 1925.  The magazine was modelled closely on Punch of London which was founded fifteen years earlier. A similar magazine, Adelaide Punch, was published in South Australia from 1878 to 1884.

History

Ray and Sinnett published the magazine 1855–1883, followed by Alex McKinley 1883.

Staff artists included Nicholas Chevalier 1855–1861, Tom Carrington 1866–1887, J. H. Leonard 1886 – c. 1891.

Contributing artists included J. C. Bancks, Luther Bradley, O. R. Campbell, George Dancey, Tom Carrington, Ambrose Dyson and his brother Will Dyson, S. T. Gill, Samuel Calvert, Alex Gurney, Hal Gye, Percy Leason, Emile Mercier, Alex Sass, Montague Scott, Alf Vincent and Cecil "Unk" White.

Editors included Frederick Sinnett (1855–1857), James Smith (1857–1863), Charles Bright (1863–1866), William Jardine Smith (1866-1869), Tom Carrington (intermittently) and John Bede Dalley (1924).

Writers included Butler Cole Aspinall, Charles Gavan Duffy, R. H. Horne, James Smith, Thomas Carrington and Nicholas Chevalier.

It was involved in the creation of The Ashes cricket trophy in 1883.

It incorporated the Melbourne Bulletin in 1886, after which it became more involved with "society" news.

A cartoon titled "BAIL-UP!" in 1900 was possibly the first published use of the Kelly Gang in a satirical context.

It was acquired by The Melbourne Herald in 1924 and amalgamated with Table Talk in 1926.

An annual, variously titled Punch Almanac, Melbourne Punch Almanack, Melbourne Punch's Office Almanack and similar, was published for a time.

The publication was Folio size and initially contained 8 pages, increasing to 12 pages in 1878 and was 18 pages by 1891. It sold for sixpence.

References

Wilde, W. H.The Oxford Companion to Australian Literature 2nd ed.

Literature
Mahood, Marguerite The Loaded Line 1973

External links
Digitised Melbourne Punch from the National Library of Australia
Digitised World War I Victorian newspapers from the State Library of Victoria

Defunct magazines published in Australia
Magazines established in 1855
Magazines disestablished in 1925
1855 establishments in Australia
Magazines published in Melbourne
1925 disestablishments in Australia
Satirical magazines
Weekly magazines published in Australia